John McCombie (15 June 1849 – 3 September 1926) was a New Zealand gold prospector and miner, mine manager. He was born in Onehunga, Auckland, New Zealand, on 15 June 1849.

References

1849 births
1926 deaths
New Zealand gold prospectors
New Zealand miners